Francesco Brambilla (16th century) was an Italian sculptor of the Renaissance period, active in Milan, in the decoration of its massive gothic Cathedral.

References

Artists from Milan
Renaissance sculptors
16th-century Italian sculptors
Italian male sculptors